Ricardo Iván Sendra (born 4 October 1987) is an Argentine professional footballer who currently plays as a midfielder for Hong Kong Premier League club Resources Capital.

Club career

Kimberley
In preparation of the 2014-15 Torneo Argentino B, Kimberley de Mar del Plata announced that they would sign Sendra; he left them some months later.

Alvarado
Club Atlético Alvarado signed 5 players, including Sendra, in February 2015 in a bid to bolster their squad.

Geylang International
Sendra was handed a trial with S.League side, Geylang International FC and played in a pre-season friendly against the Singapore U-22. After signing for Geylang, he featured for them in friendlies in Malaysia and Thailand. He had a slow start to the season, making only one appearance in the Eagles' first four games due to a small injury. However, in Geylang's 5th game of the season, Sendra was handed his first start of the season. He finally completed his first competitive 90 minutes for the Eagles and injected much needed creativity in the final third in a 2-0 win over the Garena Young Lions.

Perseru Serui
Sendra did not continue with Geylang and decided to accept a lucrative offer from Indonesian 1st tier team Perseru Serui. He only completed two months with the team and left after economic conditions were not satisfied by Perseru. As a consequence Ricardo could not sign for any other team in Indonesia and had to settle training with other players without a team for a few months until he accepted an offer to play again in Spain 3rd division team Inter Ibiza CD.

Mendiola
Sendra moved to the Philippines to play in the Philippines Football League, joining Mendiola.

Stallion Laguna
After a season with Mendiola, he joined Stallion Laguna.

Dynamic Herb Cebu
In 2021, Sendra joined newly-formed club Dynamic Herb Cebu. He made his debut for Cebu in a 1-0 against his former club, Stallion Laguna in the Copa Paulino Alcantara.

United City
In March 2022, Sendra signed for United City, seeking a chance of playing in the AFC Champions League.

Resources Capital
On 3 February 2023, Sendra signed for Resources Capital.

References

External links
Ricardo Ivan Sendra Oficial Video
 Ricardo Sendra, el argentino que juega en Singapur
 

Argentine footballers
Argentine expatriate footballers
Association football midfielders
Association football defenders
Torneo Federal A players
Badak Lampung F.C. players
Expatriate footballers in Indonesia
Liga 1 (Indonesia) players
Perseru Serui players
Expatriate footballers in Singapore
Singapore Premier League players
Geylang International FC players
Expatriate footballers in the Philippines
Philippines Football League players
Mendiola F.C. 1991 players
Stallion Laguna F.C. players
Global Makati F.C. players
Expatriate footballers in Hong Kong
Hong Kong Premier League players
Resources Capital FC players
Living people
1987 births
Sportspeople from Mar del Plata
Cebu F.C. players